The Montréal-Nord borough council is the local governing body of Montréal-Nord, a borough in the City of Montreal. The council consists of five members: the borough mayor (who also serves as a Montreal city councillor), two city councillors representing the borough's electoral districts, and two borough councillors representing the same electoral districts.

Montréal-Nord is former Montreal mayor Denis Coderre's home territory, and his Équipe Denis Coderre pour Montréal party is the dominant party in the borough.

Current members

Former members
Monica Ricourt was born in Haiti in 1978 and moved to Canada with her family at a young age. She has a Bachelor of Arts degree in Political Science from the Université du Québec à Montréal (2001). Ricourt was a member of the borough council from 2009 to 2017; she also served in the board of Société de transport de Montréal from 2009 to 2013. Originally elected for Union Montreal, she left this party in May 2013 and joined Coderre's party in June of the same year.

References

Municipal government of Montreal
Montréal-Nord